Sleath is a surname. Notable people by that name include:

 Danny Sleath (born 1986), English footballer.
 David Sleath, chief executive of SEGRO plc.
 Eleanor Sleath, English novelist.
 Gabriel Sleath (1674–1756), London gold- and silversmith.
 Richard Sleath (1863–1922), Australian politician.
 William Boultbee Sleath (c. 1763–1843), English teacher and clergyman.